The Families Civil Liberties Union (FCLU) is an American non-profit professional activist organization headquartered in  New York City. The FCLU fights for fairness in the family court system, and seeks to expose corruption and misconduct by family court judges, attorneys, and psychologists.

History
The Families Civil Liberties Union was founded in 2012 by Gregory Roberts, in direct response to the US Family Court's lack of protection and support for the fathers and mothers of divorcing families and the children who become harmed by protracted, expensive and emotionally damaging custody battles.

In 2019, the FCLU produced a widely viewed short film, Portrait of a Family Court Calamity, which exposed misconduct by judges and attorneys in New York City.

Mission
Since inception, the FCLU's mission has been to protect families from predatory, out of control family court system until the family court system serves to protect families.

See also
 American Civil Liberties Union (ACLU) 
 Family court
 American Civil Rights Union
 New York Civil Liberties Union

References

501(c)(4) nonprofit organizations
Civil liberties advocacy groups in the United States
Nonpartisan organizations in the United States